Marco Antonio Martinez Dabdoub is a Mexican politician. Affiliated with the National Action Party, he served as the municipal president of Nogales.

References

Sources
 Luis Alatorre, Luis; Holley, Denise (October 16, 2008). "Mayor of Nogales, Sonora, Defends City In Wake of U.S. Travel Alert". Nogales International. Retrieved September 4, 2013.
 

Living people
20th-century births
20th-century Mexican politicians
21st-century Mexican politicians
Municipal presidents in Sonora
National Action Party (Mexico) politicians
Politicians from Sonora
People from Nogales, Sonora
Year of birth missing (living people)